David Graham (born 4 August 1962) is a former professional tennis player from Australia.

Graham enjoyed most of his tennis success while playing doubles.  During his career he won 2 doubles titles.  He achieved a career-high doubles ranking of World No. 46 in 1984. He was known for his hard left-handed serve. He was sponsored by Adidas and Dunlop racquets.

Career finals

Doubles (2 titles, 2 runner-ups)

External links
 
 

Australian male tennis players
Living people
1962 births
Tennis people from New South Wales
20th-century Australian people